Shota Khabareli (born December 26, 1958) is a Georgian judoka who competed for the Soviet Union in the 1980 Summer Olympics.

In 1980 he won the gold medal in the half-middleweight class.

He was bronze medallist in the world championship in Moscow in 1983, two times silver medallist in the European championship in Brussels in 1979 and Rostock in 1982, and bronze medallist in Debrecen in 1981 and Paris in 1983.

He was a champion of the international tournaments in Warsaw in 1978 and Hungary in 1979. He was also a silver medallist in Budapest in 1985 and bronze medallist of the Jigoro Kano Cup in Tokyo in 1982.

References

External links
 http://www.judoinside.com/judoka/view/5821/shota_khabareli/
Shota Khabareli - databaseolympics profile

1958 births
Living people
Male judoka from Georgia (country)
Soviet male judoka
Olympic judoka of the Soviet Union
Judoka at the 1980 Summer Olympics
Olympic gold medalists for the Soviet Union
Olympic medalists in judo
Medalists at the 1980 Summer Olympics

Recipients of the Presidential Order of Excellence